Guerdon Saltonstall Trueblood (November 2, 1933 – March 3, 2021) was a Costa Rican-born American screenwriter, producer, director and actor.

Early life and education
Trueblood was born in San Jose, Costa Rica to Edward Gatewood Trueblood (1905-1994) and Elizabeth (1906-1973), daughter of United States Army general and aviator Billy Mitchell. He had an elder sister, Felicity (1932-2021). Edward Trueblood was a Princeton-educated diplomat assigned to Asuncion, Santiago, and Paris, and would later serve as a UNESCO cultural relations officer in Uruguay and India, and as permanent U.S. representative to UNESCO stationed in Paris; he was also a senior editor of the Encyclopædia Britannica, and an associate professor of Latin American Studies in Phoenix, Arizona. The Trueblood family had been resident in America since 1682, being descendants of John Trueblood, of Shoreditch, London, England.

At age eight, his parents having divorced in 1940, Trueblood went to live with his grandparents in Alexandria, Virginia. After serving in the United States Navy as a sonar technician, he attended George Washington University, majoring in speech and drama, then lived in Provence, France before moving to Hollywood in 1969.

Career
Trueblood co-wrote, with Richard Matheson, Jaws 3D (1983); and Sole Survivor (1970), directed by Paul Stanley and starring Vince Edwards, Richard Basehart and William Shatner. He directed the cinematography of Hollywood Meat Cleaver Massacre (1976), where he also played the nuthouse doctor starring Christopher Lee.

He created, produced and wrote Bravo Two (1977), directed by Ernest Pintoff. He directed The Candy Snatchers (1973), written by Bryan Gindoff and produced by Marmot Productions.

Personal life
In 1964, Trueblood married Anne-Marie ("Anna") Vaughan Read, who predeceased him; they had two sons- visual effects artist Guerdon jr, and Christopher- and a daughter, Alexandra. Trueblood died on March 3, 2021, in Sister Bay, Wisconsin, at the age of 87.

Filmography

Films

Television series

References

External links
 
 

1933 births
2021 deaths
20th-century American writers
American film directors
American film producers
American male film actors
American male screenwriters
American male television actors
American male television writers
American television directors
American television producers
Costa Rican emigrants to the United States
George Washington University alumni
Male actors from Alexandria, Virginia
Male actors from San José, Costa Rica
United States Navy sailors
Writers from Alexandria, Virginia
Writers from San José, Costa Rica
Costa Rican male film actors
Costa Rican male television actors
Costa Rican film producers
Costa Rican film directors